Tabragalba is a rural locality in the Scenic Rim Region of South East Queensland, Australia.

Geography
The eastern border of Tabragalba follows a ridge line and includes Mount Tabragalba.  Part of the western boundary is marked by the Albert River. Agriculture is the predominant land use.

The Beaudesert–Nerang Road (locally named Beaudesert–Beenleigh Road) runs in from the west, and then traverses the northern end. The Beaudesert–Beenleigh Road runs away to the north-east from the north-west boundary.

History
The locality takes its name from a local pastoral station established in 1843. The name is from the Bundjalung language dhaberi gaba meaning the place of club or nulla nulla.

The name was also used for an early local government area called Tabragalba Division (established 1879) which became the Shire of Tabragalba (1903), then renamed a few months later as Shire of Beaudesert. In 2008, the shire was merged into the new Scenic Rim Region.

Tabragalba Provisional School opened on 24 April 1907. On 1 January 1909 it became Tabragalba State School. It closed on 11 July 1945.

Heritage listings
Tabragalba has a number of heritage-listed sites, including:
 Tabragalba House Road: Wyambyn

The heritage-listed Wyambyn homestead was designed by Robin Dods and built in 1909 at Tabragalba.  The design features the Arts and Crafts architectural style. Cattle were originally raised on the property until the 1920s when sheep became more profitable.  The homestead was used as a setting in the movie Unfinished Sky in 2007.

Amenities 
There is a rifle range and pistol club in Sprengler Road.

References

External links

 
Scenic Rim Region
Localities in Queensland